Charlie or Charles Williamson may refer to:

C. N. Williamson (Charles Norris Williamson, 1859–1920), English writer and motoring journalist
Charles C. Williamson (1877–1965), American library director
Charlie Williamson (footballer, born 1956), Scottish left-back
Charlie Williamson (footballer, born 1962), English left-back
Charles Williamson (rapper) (born 1977), American performer, stage name Guerilla Black

See also
G. C. Williamson (George Charles Williamson, 1858–1942), English art historian